Dog Dome is a granite dome in the Tuolumne Meadows area of Yosemite National Park. Dog Dome is quite near Lembert Dome, which is just northeast. Dog Dome is also near to Dog Lake.

Dog Dome offers nearly the same views as from atop Lembert Dome, but the  round-trip hike leads to far smaller crowds, plus, the climb to the top is  feet shorter.

Only from a certain angle is Dog Dome domelike in appearance; it has a gentle slope on one side, and a sharp slope on the other.  See roche moutonnée.

On Dog Dome's particulars

Dog Dome is a target of rock climbers, and has a variety of routes.

References

External links and reference

 A topographic map of Dog Dome's area

Granite domes of Yosemite National Park